Sandra Suubi (born 1990) is a Ugandan gospel musician and visual artist.

Early years and education 
Suubi was born in Kampala, Uganda in 1990. She had her primary education at Greenhill Academy and her secondary education Gayaza High School, both in Kampala. She attended the Makerere University where she acquired a bachelor's degree in Fine Arts from the  Margaret Trowell School of Industrial and Fine Art. In January 2018, she graduated from the same University with a master's degree in Fine Arts.

Career 
While in secondary school, Suubi was part of the school's chapel choir. She began her career as a musician in 2011 when she joined a girl group called Xabu under the direction of First Love. With the group, she started to perform at different events while at the university. In 2015, the group split, so she joined the Airtel Trace Music competition and won. She went ahead to represent Uganda in the East African category at the International level of the competition.  She released her debut album in 2016 which features two singles, Togwamu Suubi and Nsiimye. Her song, Togwamu Subi  was featured as the sound track for the award winning film Veronica’s Wish in 2018. She released her second album in 2018 and this album features songs like Onjagande nyo, Kingdom come, Heaven and Jangu Tuzine.

Aside music, Suubi works as an eco-artist. She recycles plastic waste to create installations, stage back drops, jewelry and home decorations. Her art work has featured in different Kampala art festivals like the Bayimba 2013 back drop, the laba 2014 Headphones, Bodaboda Helmet and the concept of the bird during the Kampala art.

Discography 

 Anthems of Life (2016)
 Anthems of Life, Ep (2018)
 Faya

Awards 

 She won the Best New Artiste of the year 2015 - Victoria Gospel Academy (VIGA) awards
She won the Upcoming Female Artist of the year 2016 - VIGA Awards

References

Living people
Ugandan women musicians
Ugandan artists
Makerere University alumni
1990 births
People from Kampala